Charles Dougherty (October 15, 1850 – October 11, 1915) was an American Democratic politician.

He was born in Athens, Georgia, where he attended public schools. He also studied at the University of Virginia in Charlottesville.

He moved to Florida in 1871, settled near Port Orange, and engaged in planting.  He served in the State house of representatives from 1877 until 1885, including as speaker in 1879. He was elected as a Democrat to United States House of Representatives for the Forty-ninth and Fiftieth Congresses (March 4, 1885 – March 3, 1889). He resumed agricultural pursuits before again becoming a member of the state house of representatives in 1891, 1892, 1911, and 1912. He served in the State senate from 1895 until 1898.

Dougherty died at Daytona Beach, Volusia County, Fla., on October 11, 1915; interment in Pinewood Cemetery.

References

 Charles Dougherty at Find a Grave

1850 births
1915 deaths
Politicians from Athens, Georgia
Democratic Party members of the United States House of Representatives from Florida
Speakers of the Florida House of Representatives
Democratic Party members of the Florida House of Representatives
Democratic Party Florida state senators
University of Virginia alumni
19th-century American politicians